Rampa Rebellion may refer to:

Rampa Rebellion of 1879
Rampa Rebellion of 1922